The 2010 Chinese Artistic Gymnastics Championships were held from  22 August to 31 August 2010 in Zhuzhou, Hunan. It was also the qualification event for the 2010 Asian Games and 2010 World Artistic Gymnastics Championships.

Men's Event Medal Winners

Women's Event Medal Winners

References

Chinese Artistic Gymnastics Championships
2010 in Chinese sport
Chinese Artistic Gymnastics Championships